The following is a list of the 15 cantons of the Creuse department, in France, following the French canton reorganisation which came into effect in March 2015:

 Ahun
 Aubusson
 Auzances
 Bonnat
 Bourganeuf
 Boussac
 Dun-le-Palestel
 Évaux-les-Bains
 Felletin
 Gouzon
 Le Grand-Bourg
 Guéret-1
 Guéret-2
 Saint-Vaury
 La Souterraine

References